Y6  may refer to:
 LNER Class Y6, a class of British steam locomotives 
 Neuropeptide Y receptor Y6, a human gene
 SJ Y6, a series of diesel railcar s operated by Statens Järnvägar (SJ) of Sweden
 Year 6, like in French Republican Calendar/Y6
 A Mazda diesel engines
 An honors Judaic Studies class at Hillel Yeshiva High School
 Batavia Air, IATA code Y6

Y-6 may refer to :
 The Chinese designation for the Ilyushin Il-14 aircraft.